The 35th Legislature of Yukon were elected at the 2021 Yukon general election. Jeremy Harper is the current speaker of the Yukon Legislative Assembly

Executive council

Seating plan

Current members

References 

Lists of people from Yukon
35
2021 in Canadian politics
Legislature, 35
Yukon politics-related lists